The 1986 World Women's Handball Championship took place in the Netherlands between 4–14 December 1986.

Qualification
Host nation
 

Qualified from the 1984 Summer Olympics
 
 
 

Qualified from the 1985 World Championship B
 
 
 
 
 
 
 
 
 

Qualified from Asia
 

Qualified from the 1986 Pan American Women's Handball Championship
 

Qualified from the 1985 African Women's Handball Championship
  (later replaced by )

Preliminary round

Group A

Group B

Group C

Group D

Main round

Group E

Group F

Group G

Finals

Eleventh Place Playoff

Ninth Place Playoff

Seventh Place Playoff

Fifth Place Playoff

Third Place Playoff

Final

Final standings

References

 International Handball Federation

W
W
World Handball Championship tournaments
W
Women's handball in the Netherlands
December 1986 sports events in Europe